Joseph Thomas Dawley (born September 19, 1971) is an American former Major League Baseball player.

External links
Baseball-reference.com profile
Baseballcube.com profile

1971 births
Atlanta Braves players
Cleveland Indians players
Living people
Buffalo Bisons (minor league) players
Riverside City Tigers baseball players
Bluefield Orioles players
Frederick Keys players
Greenville Braves players
Richmond Braves players
Myrtle Beach Pelicans players
Akron Aeros players
Omaha Royals players
Iowa Cubs players
Portland Beavers players
Major League Baseball pitchers
Baseball players from California
Lancaster Barnstormers players
Chico Heat players
Palm Springs Suns players
Albany Polecats players
American expatriate baseball players in Taiwan
Brother Elephants players